Kutztown Airport  is a closed, public use airport located one nautical mile (1.85 km) south of the central business district of Kutztown, a borough in Berks County, Pennsylvania, United States.

Facilities and aircraft 
It has two runways: 17/35 is 2,460 by 240 feet (750 x 73 m) with an asphalt and turf surface; 10/28 is 2,221 by 150 feet (677 x 46 m) with a turf surface.

For the 12-month period ending April 26, 2007, the airport had 44,250 aircraft operations, an average of 121 per day: 99% general aviation, <1% military and <1% air taxi. At that time there were 40 aircraft based at this airport: 62.5% single-engine, 10% glider and 27.5% ultralight.

Closure 
In a letter sent by airport owners Nicholas Prikis and Sophie Pittas on October 6, it was announced that the airport would close all operation on January 31, 2009.

References

External links 
 Kutztown Airport (N31) information from Pennsylvania DOT Bureau of Aviation
 Aerial image as of 13 April 1999 from USGS The National Map
 Video of Cessna 172 landing at Kutztown Airport

Defunct airports in Pennsylvania
Transportation buildings and structures in Berks County, Pennsylvania